Jordi Mboula Queralt (born 16 March 1999) is a Spanish professional footballer who plays as winger for Segunda División club Racing Santander, on loan from RCD Mallorca.

Club career

Early career
Born in Granollers, Barcelona, Catalonia to a Congolese father and a Spanish mother, Mboula's parents met in China, and he spent two years of his youth there. At the age of 9, Mboula begun playing football with his local club CF Ametlla for six months, before joining EC Granollers for a year, and finally moving to FC Barcelona.

Monaco
A member of Barcelona's youth academy, La Masia, Mboula joined AS Monaco FC on 21 July 2017, keeping him at the club until 2022. He made his professional debut for Monaco in a 0–0 Ligue 1 draw at home to Amiens SC on 28 April 2018, coming on as a substitute for Rony Lopes for the final six minutes. On 19 May, in the last game of the season, he replaced the same player in added time and scored his first goal in a 3–0 win at relegated Troyes AC.

On 15 July 2019, Mboula was loaned to Belgian side Cercle Brugge K.S.V. for one year. The following 29 January, he returned to Spain after agreeing to a six-month deal with SD Huesca in Segunda División.

Mallorca
On 17 September 2020, Mboula signed a four-year contract with RCD Mallorca, recently relegated to the second division.

Loans
On 31 January 2022, Mboula moved to Primeira Liga side Estoril on loan until June. On 24 August, he moved to Racing de Santander in the second division, in a temporary one-year deal.

International career
Mboula was part of the Spain national under-17 football team that were runners-up at the 2016 UEFA European Under-17 Championship in Azerbaijan. He scored in their 2–0 opening win against the Netherlands.

Career statistics

Honors

International 
Spain U17
UEFA European Under-17 Championship runner-up: 2016

References

External links
 AS Monaco Profile
 
 
 
 

1999 births
Living people
AS Monaco FC players
Association football wingers
Belgian Pro League players
Cercle Brugge K.S.V. players
Championnat National 2 players
Expatriate footballers in Belgium
Expatriate footballers in Monaco
Expatriate footballers in Portugal
FC Barcelona Atlètic players
G.D. Estoril Praia players
La Liga players
Ligue 1 players
Footballers from Granollers
Primeira Liga players
RCD Mallorca players
Racing de Santander players
SD Huesca footballers
Segunda División B players
Segunda División players
Spain youth international footballers
Spanish expatriate footballers
Spanish expatriate sportspeople in Belgium
Spanish expatriate sportspeople in Monaco
Spanish expatriate sportspeople in Portugal
Spanish footballers
Spanish people of Republic of the Congo descent
Spanish sportspeople of African descent